The Grape and Wine Research and Development Corporation was an entity of the Department of Agriculture, Fisheries and Forestry of the Government of Australia. It was responsible for research, development and extension for the Australian wine industry. In 2014, it was merged with Wine Australia to create the Australian Grape and Wine Authority.

References

Defunct Commonwealth Government agencies of Australia
Wine industry organizations
Australian distilled drinks
Australian wine
2014 disestablishments in Australia
Government agencies disestablished in 2014
Research and development in Australia